The fourth series of Waterloo Road, a British television school drama series created by Ann McManus and Maureen Chadwick and produced by BBC Scotland and Shed Productions, commenced airing in the United Kingdom on 7 January 2009 and concluded after 20 episodes on 20 May 2009.

Waterloo Road's fourth series aired in the United Kingdom on Wednesdays at 8:00 pm GMT on BBC One, a terrestrial television network, where it received an average of 4.76 million viewers per episode.

Plot
The show follows the lives of the teachers and the pupils at the eponymous school of Waterloo Road, a failing inner-city comprehensive, tackling a wide range of issues often seen as taboo such as steroid abuse, teenage pregnancy, childbirth, adoption, bigamy, gun violence, burn injury, homeschooling, virginity, Type 1 diabetes, breast augmentation, poverty, alcoholism and smuggling.

Premise
The fourth series picks up after the events of the third series finale, which involved a fire almost destroying the school and left the fate of several staff and pupils unknown.

The Kelly family are introduced as prominent characters this series, often referred to as the "family from hell". The family consists of alcoholic mother, Rose Kelly (Elaine Symons), and her five children, who all enrol at Waterloo Road and bring many problems with them. Later in the series, a major plot sees pupil Maxine Barlow (Ellie Paskell) led to tragedy after getting together with Earl Kelly (Reece Noi).

Other plots this series include new Head of PE Rob Cleaver (Elyes Gabel), who trains pupil Bolton Smilie (Tachia Newall) using pills that give him an unfair advantage and more of headteacher Rachel Mason's (Eva Pope) secrets being exposed following the arrival of her sister, Melissa Ryan (Katy Carmichael) as well as her nephew, Phillip (Dean Smith). Also, troubled pupil Chlo Grainger (Katie Griffiths) giving birth and, finally, the return of former Head of Pastoral Care Kim Campbell (Angela Griffin), who smuggles a baby girl into the country on her return from Rwanda.

Cast and characters

Staff
 Eva Pope as Rachel Mason; Headteacher (19 episodes)
 Neil Morrissey as Eddie Lawson; Deputy Headteacher and Mathematics teacher (20 episodes)
 Jason Done as Tom Clarkson; Head of Pastoral Care and English teacher (20 episodes)
 Denise Welch as Steph Haydock; Head of French (19 episodes)
 Shabana Bakhsh as Jasmine Koreshi; Deputy Head of English (19 episodes)
 Philip Martin Brown as Grantly Budgen; Head of English (18 episodes)
 Elaine Symons as Rose Kelly; Canteen Assistant (18 episodes)
 Chris Geere as Matt Wilding; Head of Music and Drama (17 episodes)
 Christine Tremarco as Davina Shackleton; Teaching Assistant (13 episodes)
 Kay Purcell as Candice Smilie; Senior Canteen Assistant (13 episodes)
 Katy Carmichael as Melissa Ryan; Head of Extended Services (11 episodes)
 Angela Griffin as Kim Campbell; Head of Pastoral Care and Art teacher (10 episodes)
 Elyes Gabel as Rob Cleaver; Head of Physical Education (10 episodes)

Pupils
 Chelsee Healey as Janeece Bryant (20 episodes)
 Zaraah Abrahams as Michaela White (20 episodes)
 Luke Bailey as Marley Kelly (20 episodes)
 Katie Griffiths as Chlo Grainger (19 episodes)
 Holly Kenny as Sambuca Kelly (19 episodes)
 Tachia Newall as Bolton Smilie (19 episodes)
 Sadie Pickering as Flick Mellor (19 episodes)
 Thomas Milner as Paul Langley (18 episodes)
 Adam Thomas as Donte Charles (18 episodes)
 Lucy Dixon as Danielle Harker (17 episodes)
 Lauren Thomas as Aleesha Dillon (17 episodes)
 Dean Smith as Philip Ryan (16 episodes)
 Jessica Baglow as Karla Bentham (14 episodes)
 Reece Douglas as Denzil Kelly (13 episodes)
 Darcy Isa as Lauren Andrews (9 episodes)
 Reece Noi as Earl Kelly (8 episodes)
 Ellie Paskell as Maxine Barlow (8 episodes)

Others

Recurring
 Malcolm Scates as Ralph Mellor; Chair of Governors and Flick's father (7 episodes)
 Tim Healy as Dave Miller; Head of Security (5 episodes)
 Lorraine Cheshire as Fleur Budgen; Grantly's wife (3 episodes)
 Alan McKenna as Mr. Parker; Deportation officer (3 episodes)
 Jamie Glover as Andrew Treneman; Former Deputy Headteacher (2 episodes)
 Steve Money as Clarence Charles; Donte's father (2 episodes)
 Caroline O'Neill as Mrs. Bryant; Janeece's mother (2 episodes)

Guest
 Rachael Cairns as Tasha Lefton; Pupil (1 episode)
 Naveed Choudhry as Shahid Kapoor; Pupil (1 episode)
 Daniela Denby-Ashe as Jem Allen; Supply teacher (1 episode)
 Elize du Toit as Heather; Presenter of the North West Schools Choir competition (1 episode)
 Joe Duttine as Andy Harker; Danielle's father (1 episode)
 Sheraiah Larcher as Maaka Lacey; Supply teacher (1 episode)
 Conrad Nelson as Bill Willis; Songwriter and poet (1 episode)
 Rupert Procter as Mr. Peters; Kyle's father (1 episode)
 Jack Rigby as Kyle Peters; Pupil (1 episode)
 Natalie J. Robb as Charlotte Monk; School counsellor (1 episode)
 Colin Tierney as Reynold Kelly; Rose's ex-husband and Sambuca's father (1 episode)
 Tom Turner as Gregory; Head of Music and Drama at Forest Mount (1 episode)

Episodes

{| class="wikitable plainrowheaders" width="100%"
|-
! style="background-color: #81D8D0;" colspan="8"|Autumn Term
|-
! style="background-color: #81D8D0;" | No.
! style="background-color: #81D8D0;" | Title
! style="background-color: #81D8D0;" | Directed by
! style="background-color: #81D8D0;" | Written by
! style="background-color: #81D8D0;" | Original air date
! style="background-color: #81D8D0;" | UK viewers(million)
|-

|-
! style="background-color: #81D8D0;" colspan="8"|Spring Term
|-

|}

DVD release
Three different box sets of the fourth series was released. The first ten episodes of the series were released on 21 September 2009, and the back ten episodes were released on 26 April 2010. All twenty episodes were later released together on 18 October 2010. They were released with a "12" British Board of Film Classification (BBFC) certificate.

Footnotes

References

2009 British television seasons
Waterloo Road (TV series)